Pendant vaulting is considered to be a type of English fan vaulting.  The pendant vault is a rare form of vault, attributed to fifteenth century English Gothic architecture, in which large decorative pendants hang from the vault at a distance from the walls. In some cases, the pendants are a large form of boss.   In his book on fan vaults, Walter Leedy defines the fan vault stating: “Fan vaults have the following specific interrelated visual and structural characteristics: (1) vaulting conoids of regular geometric form, (2) vertical ribs, each of consistent curvature and placement, (3) a distinct central spandrel panel, (4) ribs perpendicular to the vaulting surface, and (5) applied surface patterning.”

Origins 
The beginning of fan vaulting dates to the 14th century when Romanesque and Norman buildings were adapted by inserting a “shell form” into the existing structure. This “shell form” differed from earlier versions of Gothic vaulting primarily in its structural character.  Whereas earlier Gothic vaulting directed load paths to its ribs, fan vaulting distributed loads across the curved vaulting.  For the conoid to function properly, it had to be supported on all sides; as “walls that support it vertically, the tas-de-charge supports its bottom, and the central spandrel panel provides the necessary compressive load along its upper edge.”

With fan vaulting done in stone, the vaulting would serve as both an ornamental and fireproof layer.  The stone in turn would be protected from the elements by a steep wooden roof.  As fan vaulting was expensive to construct, a majority of the examples of the vaulting are found in chantry chapels, commissioned by wealthy patrons.  A variety of building methods were employed as builders of the vaults were more concerned with keeping to the aesthetic aggregate of the finished product rather than technical particulars.

The structural innovations allowed for developments in vaulting decoration.  As Salter states, “Unlike the Gothic vault, where the expression of forces is described by ribs and spandrels, the blocks of the fan vault conoid are free to be carved to the reticulated design of the enclosure.”  A 1901 pamphlet on English fan vaults furthers this notion, calling this period the “apogee of Gothic art” and stating, “The sturdy vigor and rational construction necessitated by the struggle to overcome physical difficulties were giving place to the fanciful refinements of the designer and craftsman who no longer feared that his building might not stand, but, with accumulated knowledge and experience, could play with his materials, and work out unfettered the creations of his imagination.” 

The development of decoration in fan vaults is notable in later forms, such as pendant vaulting.  In pendant vaulting the form and ornamentation of the vault evolve as “pendants as elongated voussoirs are dropped from a constructive pointed arch, concealed above the vaulting, and form abutments to support the pendant conoids.”

Examples of pendant vaulting 
Of particular note are the pendant vaults at the Divinity School at Oxford, built in 1480 and designed by William Orchard, and at Henry VII Chapel at Westminster Abbey, built between 1503-1509 and plausibly designed by Robert and William Vertue.  

The application of vaulting at the Divinity School at Oxford visually separates the arch from the conoids. According to Jacques Heyman, the vaulting at the divinity school intended to “astonish and delight” and possibly makes reference to “Villard’s lodge-book of c.1235; when the arch under construction has been completed, the tree trunk may be removed to leave a hanging voussoir.”

At Henry VII’s chapel, the development of ornamentation and design in pendant vaulting is furthered as the arch is concealed within the conoid.  In differentiating pendant vaulting from other types of fan vaulting at the chapel, Heyman states, “First, it is constructed throughout of jointed masonry; the ribs and panels are cut from a single stone, so that the ribs are effectively surface decoration, giving visual definition to the shape of the vault.  Second, the fans spring not from the walls of the Chapel, but from pendants placed about 2m from the walls.”  Here, concealed transverse arches intersect the conoids and provide support for the hanging pendants.

While fan vaulting is purported to be confined to England, versions of pendant vaulting came to be characteristic of the Flamboyant period in France.  An example of this can be found at Caudebec, France.

List of buildings with pendant vaults 
 Albi Cathedral - Tierceron vault
 Chapel Notre-Dame de Bon Secours, Noyon Cathedral - Lierne vault
 Chapel Royal, Hampton Court Palace - Lierne vault
 Chapelle du Saint-Esprit, Rue, Somme - Tierceron vault
 Christ Church Cathedral, Oxford, chancel - Lierne vault by William Orchard (1500).
 Christchurch Priory, quire and lady chapel - Lierne vault (1395)
 Church of Saint-Pierre, Caen - Lierne vault
 Church of the Assumption of the Virgin Mary (Most), Czech Republic - Lierne vault with flying ribs
 Collegiate Church of St Mary, Warwick, Dean's chapel - Fan vault
 Divinity School, Oxford - Lierne vault by William Orchard (1480s).
 Église Notre-Dame-des-Marais, La Ferté-Bernard - Lierne vault
 Église St. Étienne, Beauvais, side chapel - Lierne vault with flying ribs by Martin Chambiges
 Église Saint-Eustache, Paris - Lierne vault
 Great Hall, oriel window, Hampton Court Palace - Fan vault
 Henry VII Lady Chapel, Westminster Abbey - Fan vault by William Vertue (1503–1509).
 Křivoklát Castle, chapel - Lierne vault with flying ribs
 Notre Dame, Caudebec-en-Caux - Tierceron vault (c1500).  
 Senlis Cathedral, side chapels - Lierne vault with flying ribs by Martin Chambiges
 St Catherine's Chapel, St Stephen's Cathedral, Vienna - small Lierne vault with flying ribs
 St George's Chapel, Windsor , quire - Lierne vault
 St. Madeleine, Troyes , rood screen - Lierne vault

List of Gothic Revival buildings with pendant vaults 
St John's Church, Edinburgh - Fan vault
Unitarian Church in Charleston, Charleston, South Carolina, United States - Fan vault
St Mary's Church, Wellingborough, Wellingborough - Fan vault

Notes

References 
Banister, Fletcher (1905). A History of Architecture on the Comparative Method. London: Batsford. p. 290.
"English fan-vaults". The Brochure Series of Architectural Illustration. 7: 235. 1901.
Heyman, Jacques (December 2000). "An observation on the fan vault of Henry VII Chapel, Westminster". Architectural Research Quarterly. 4:4: 357-369. doi:10.1017/S1359135500000440 – via Cambridge Core.
"Late Medieval Architecture: Fan Vaulting". medieval.ucdavis.edu. Retrieved 2018-11-18.
Leedy, Walter C. (1980). Fan vaulting : a study of form, technology, and meaning. Santa Monica, CA: Arts Architecture Press. p. 1-22. .
"Pendant | architecture". Encyclopedia Britannica. Retrieved 2018-11-18.
Salter, Peter (January 2011). "Architect Peter Salter records the English innovation of the fan vault, a pragmatic and romantic alternative to the Gothic arch that has challenged his thoughts on contemporary skins". The Architectural Review. January: 70-74 – via Academic OneFile

Arches and vaults
Medieval architecture